Then Again: A Retrospective is a 1998 compilation album by Martha and the Muffins. Although credited to the band's original name, it includes songs from both the full name and M + M phases of the band's career.

The album contains one new song, "Resurrection", one of only two new tracks released by the band between their 1992 album Modern Lullaby and their 2010 album Delicate.

Track listing

References

1998 greatest hits albums
Martha and the Muffins albums